The ninth season of Married at First Sight premiered on 31 January 2022 on the Nine Network. Relationship experts John Aiken and Mel Schilling, along with sexologist Alessandra Rampolla all returned from the previous season to match 8 brides and 8 grooms together. Halfway through the experiment, the experts matched another 3 brides and 3 grooms together.

Couple profiles

Commitment ceremony history

  This couple left the experiment outside of commitment ceremony.
  This couple elected to leave the experiment during the commitment ceremony.

Controversy
During filming, contestant Simon Blackburn was removed from the show after homophobic and misogynistic videos of him surfaced on social media. A petition, signed by over 120,000 fans, called for the E-Safety Commission to look into the behaviour of Olivia Frazer after she shared around a nude photo of fellow bride Domenica Calarco without Domenica's knowledge or consent. In March 2022, the New South Wales Police Force confirmed reports they were investigating an incident involving glass smashing at the couples retreat, as well as the distribution of an image without consent.

Ratings

References

9
2022 Australian television seasons
Television shows filmed in Australia